Climacteric is a bimonthly peer-reviewed medical journal that covers all aspects of aging in women, especially during the menopause. As the official journal of the International Menopause Society, Climacteric also publishes position statements and workshop proceedings from the society.

Climacteric was established in 1998. According to the Journal Citation Reports, the journal has a 2014 impact factor of 2.264. The editors-in-chief are Anna Fenton (Christchurch Women's Hospital) and Nick Panay 'Queen Charlotte's and Chelsea Hospital).

References

External links 
 
 International Menopause Society

Publications established in 1998
Menopause
Taylor & Francis academic journals
Obstetrics and gynaecology journals
Gerontology journals
Bimonthly journals